The Journal of Logic and Computation is a peer-reviewed academic journal focused on logic and computing. It was established in 1990 and is published by Oxford University Press under licence from Professor Dov Gabbay as owner of the journal.

External links 
 

Publications established in 1990
Computer science journals
Logic journals
Logic in computer science
Formal methods publications
Oxford University Press academic journals
Bimonthly journals
English-language journals